NGC 7835 is a spiral galaxy located about 215 million light-years away in the constellation of Pisces. It was discovered by astronomer Albert Marth on November 29, 1864.

See also 
 List of NGC objects (7001–7840)

References

External links 

7835
000505
Pisces (constellation)
Astronomical objects discovered in 1864
Spiral galaxies
Discoveries by Albert Marth